Gilles Chiasson (born November 1, 1966) is an American producer, director, composer, writer and actor.  While he first came to prominence as an actor, particularly in the original cast of the Tony Award and Pulitzer Prize winning RENT, Chiasson went on to work in film and television development and now focuses on theater administration and operations.  He currently lives in Los Angeles, California, with his wife Sherri Parker Lee and their two sons.

Early life
Chiasson was born in Muskegon, Michigan.  His parents are Dr. Tony Chiasson, a retired anesthesiologist, and Claire Chiasson, the founder and headmistress of Michigan Dunes Montessori.  Both are French Canadian.  He is the youngest of five children.  He attended Mona Shores Public Schools.  He received a Bachelor of Fine Arts from The School of Music at the University of Michigan.

Career

Theatre

Soon after earning his BFA, Chiasson landed the role of the young idealist Marius in the National Tour of Les Misérables (musical).  He followed this by portraying Jinx in the National Tour of Forever Plaid.  However, Chiasson may be best known as an original cast member of Jonathan Larson’s RENT.

Chiasson took part in the original RENT workshop in 1994.  (The only other Broadway cast members to do so were Anthony Rapp and Daphne Rubin-Vega.)  He played multiple roles, including Squeegie Man and Steve, in the original Off-Broadway production at New York Theatre Workshop the following year.  The show’s creator, Jonathan Larson, died suddenly the night before the Off-Broadway premiere, but the production carried on and became a hit.  Chiasson received an Obie Award as a member of the Off-Broadway cast.  He reprised his multiple roles when RENT moved to Broadway in the spring of 1996.  During his nearly two years in RENT on Broadway, Chiasson also played the lead roles of Mark and Roger.

Chiasson originated on Broadway the role of Armand St. Just in THE SCARLET PIMPERNEL and Corporal William McEwen in The Civil War (musical).  Both shows were nominated for the Tony Award for Best Musical, and Chiasson received an Outer Critics Circle Nomination for Best Supporting Actor in a Musical for The Civil War (musical).

Chiasson theatre credits include many, many Off-Broadway and regional theatre productions, including the world premieres of the Mike Reid musical, A House Divided at Tennessee Repertory Theatre, Joanne Lessener and Joshua Rosenbaum’s Fermat's Last Tango at the York Theatre, and Elizabeth Swados’ GROUNDHOG at Manhattan Theatre Club.

Chiasson’s last appearance on Broadway was in the original cast of Baz Luhrmann’s production of La bohème.  He reprised his role when the show proceeded to Los Angeles, a move which led to his second act in production and development.

Chiasson has worked as a freelance director, New York, Los Angeles, and Chicago. His productions include Way of the Wiseguy (Chicago Center for the Performing Arts), I’m Sorry (The Lounge Theatre, LA; New York International Fringe Festival, Into the Woods and Heading Home (Performing Arts Education Centers).

Chiasson went on to serve as Producing Director of LA's Reprise Theatre Company, alongside Artistic Director, Jason Alexander, during their 2010-11 and 2011-12 Seasons. The company received 17 Ovation Awards nominations for Chiasson's inaugural season as Producing Director, the most of any theatre company in Southern California, ultimately winning the Ovation for Best Production of a Musical for their revival of Cole Porter's Kiss Me, Kate (musical) as well as a Los Angeles Drama Critics Circle Award for their production of Cabaret (musical) during their 2011-12 season.  During his tenure at Reprise, Chiasson presented acclaimed artists such as Barry Manilow, Barbara Cook, Patti LuPone, Betty Buckley, Ray Romano, Martin Short, and Sutton Foster in concert in venues throughout Los Angeles including the Saban Theatre in Beverly Hills and UCLA’s Royce Hall.

Chiasson currently heads up the LVUSD Beacon for the Arts Fund and serves as Director of Theater Operations of The Performing Arts Education Centers (the PAECs) located in Calabasas and Agoura Hills, CA.  These two state-of-the-art theater complexes consist of two buildings in two locations, each having a 650+ seat Mainstage, a 100-seat Black Box, professionally equipped scene and costume shop, and all requisite support spaces and using Vendini for ticketing.

Film and television
From 2005 - 2010 Chiasson was the Director of Development for Moresco Productions. In that time he worked closely with Bobby Moresco, winner of the 2005 Academy Award for Best Original Screenplay for Crash (2004 film).  Projects have included the television series The Black Donnellys for NBC and the adaptation of CRASH for Starz (TV channel).  Chiasson has been integral to the evolution of several scripts, currently in development for both feature and television production.  He is a Co-Producer of The Kings of Appletown starring the Sprouse twins famous for their work on Disney Channel’s The Suite Life of Zack & Cody.

Music
Chiasson wrote the music, lyrics and book of CHRYSALIS, an original musical that has been seen in workshops at the Alley Theatre in Houston, the New York Theatre Workshop and the Manhattan Theatre Club and premiered at the Adirondack Theatre Festival. His other musicals include FISHWRAP, co-conceived with Bill Castellino (Adirondack Theater Festival), MAPS and the movie musical MOVE AHEAD, with David Hilder (RAW Impressions NYC), and NOW BOARDING (Performing Arts Education Centers).

Chiasson conceived and co-produced his debut solo CD Slow Down.  He has been a guest soloist with the Dallas Symphony Orchestra (DSO), the Philharmonia of the Nations, the Ann Arbor Symphony Orchestra (A2SO), and the West Michigan Symphony Orchestra, which allowed him to perform in his hometown theatre where he first took to the stage, The Frauenthal Center for the Performing Arts. Co-wrote “Hands Holding Hands” with Nashville songwriter, Chris Roberts, famed for One Flew South, which premiered in BRAVE NEW WORLD, American Theatre Responds to 9/11, at The Town Hall (New York City) and received radio play across the U.S.A. Their song, “Sweet Mystery”, appears on LML Music In Good Company.

Entertainment business
Chiasson is former a Moderator of Bobby Moresco's Actors Gym in Los Angeles, a weekly workshop for working professional writers and actors.   Chiasson is a founder and advisory board member of the Adirondack Theatre Festival, a non-profit theatre in Glens Falls, New York, established in 1995.

Television appearances
As an original cast member of RENT:
1996 Tony Awards,
1997 Tony Awards,
2008 Tony Awards,
The Rosie O'Donnell Show,
The Tonight Show with Jay Leno,
Late Show with David Letterman,
1996 Democratic Convention,
Good Morning America,
20/20, 
RENT: Filmed Live On Broadway in 2008, 
RENT: Live on Fox in 2019.

As an original cast member of The Scarlet Pimpernel (musical):
1998 Tony Awards (The Scarlet Pimpernel),
The Rosie O'Donnell Show,
The 1998 NBC All-Star Game Half-Time Show.

As an original cast member of The Civil War (musical):
1999 Tony Awards,
1999 Drama Desk Awards.

As an original cast member of Baz Luhrmann’s La Bohème:
2003 Tony Awards.

Discography
RENT - The Original Broadway Cast Recording,
THE SCARLET PIMPERNEL - The Original Broadway Cast Recording,
LA BOHÈME - The Original Broadway Cast Recording,
FERMAT’S LAST TANGO - Original Cast Recording,
SLOW DOWN – Slow Down Productions (CD Baby).

References

External links
 
 

American male stage actors
American male writers
Living people
1966 births
Male actors from Los Angeles
People from Muskegon, Michigan
University of Michigan School of Music, Theatre & Dance alumni
Writers from Los Angeles